Phallus atrovolvatus is a species of fungus in the stinkhorn family. Found in Costa Rica, it was described as new to science in 2005.

References

External links

Fungi described in 2005
Fungi of Central America
Phallales